Coleen Pekin is an Australian former sprinter.

She won 3 bronze medals at the Commonwealth Games: the 200 metres in 1978, the 4 x 100 metres relay in 1978, and the 100 metres in 1982.

She was initially selected for the 1980 Moscow Olympics, before being dropped. She retired from racing in 1983 to start a family.

Her daughter Lyndsay Pekin competed as a sprinter and hurdler at the 2014 Commonwealth Games.

References

Living people
Sportswomen from Western Australia
Australian female sprinters
Commonwealth Games medallists in athletics
Commonwealth Games bronze medallists for Australia
Athletes (track and field) at the 1978 Commonwealth Games
Athletes (track and field) at the 1982 Commonwealth Games
Year of birth missing (living people)
Medallists at the 1982 Commonwealth Games
20th-century Australian women